FK Čukarički is a professional football club based in Čukarica, Belgrade, Serbia.

Managers

References

External links
 

 
Cukaricki